= Maritimo (company) =

Australian motor yacht company

- Type: Privately held company
- Industry: Boat Builders / Manufacturing
- Founders: Bill Barry-Cotter
- Headquarters: Gold Coast, Queensland
- Area served: Worldwide
- Products: M-Series Motor Yachts, S-Series Sedan Yachts, X-Series Sport Yachts, Maritimo Offshore Race Team
- Owner: Bill Barry-Cotter
- Number of employees: 200+
- Parent: Maritimo (MFG) International Pty Ltd
- Website: www.maritimo.com.au

Maritimo is an Australian builder of motor yachts. The company's hand-built yachts include the M-Series Flybridge, the S-Series Sedan, and the X-Series Sport Yacht.

The company was established by Bill Barry-Cotter.
